The United States men's national rugby union team represents the United States in men's international rugby union. Nicknamed the Eagles, it is controlled by USA Rugby, the national governing body for the sport of rugby union in the United States. USA Rugby is a member of Rugby Americas North, one of six regional governing bodies under World Rugby. Until rugby returned to Olympic competition, with sevens at the 2016 Rio Games, the United States was the reigning Olympic rugby champion, having defeated the one other competitor in 1920 and the two other competitors at the 1924 Summer Olympics.

, the men's Eagles are ranked 18th in the world by the World Rugby Rankings. Their previous highest ranking was 12th, achieved ahead of the 2019 World Cup. The team's lowest ranking was 20th, first following a winless campaign in the 2008 Churchill Cup and second for a single week in 2022 during the 2023 World Cup qualifying tournament.

The highest profile tournament in which the men's Eagles play is the Rugby World Cup. The men's Eagles have played in all but two Rugby World Cups since the tournament began in 1987. The United States is hosting the 2031 Rugby World cup.

The United States competed in the Pacific Nations Cup every Summer from 2013 to 2015. Previously, the U.S. has competed in the now-defunct Churchill Cup and the Pan American Championship. In April 2015, USA Rugby announced the creation of a new, annual International Championship to be contested among the top-6 ranked rugby nations in the Americas: Argentina, Brazil, Canada, Chile, Uruguay and the United States. The contest was named the Americas Rugby Championship and began in 2016. The United States won the 2017 Americas Rugby Championship after drawing with Argentina XV. It was the United States' first 15-a-side rugby union title in over 90 years.

History

Early years: 1872–1913

Informal football games such as rugby became popular in the United States in the mid-19th century. Rugby union was played as early as 1872 among rugby clubs in the San Francisco Bay Area composed mainly of British expatriates. On December 2, 1882, the first Californian representative rugby team to play an outside opponent, took on a group of rugby-playing ex-Britons, who called themselves the Phoenix Rugby Club of San Francisco. California lost to the Phoenix club 7–4.

The first recorded rugby game in the U.S. was played in May 1874 when local Harvard University hosted Canadian McGill University. The game sparked an interest on college campuses nationwide. In 1876 Yale, Harvard, Princeton, and Columbia formed the Intercollegiate Football Association, which largely used the rugby code. In 1886 Harvard's Oscar Shafter Howard introduced these rules to the campus of the University of California, Berkeley.

American football was fierce, and as injuries mounted, the public became alarmed at its brutalities and President Theodore Roosevelt threatened to outlaw the sport. Beginning in 1906, rugby union became the game of choice at Stanford University, University of California, Berkeley and several other colleges in California. Rugby's popularity, however, was short lived, and the sport had died out by the outbreak of World War I.

A California student team toured Australia and New Zealand in 1910, and invited their hosts to return the visit. Australia obliged by touring North America in 1912, and the U.S. national team played its first international match on November 16, 1912 against Australia in Berkeley, California. The visitors won 12–8. A year later, the U.S. hosted New Zealand at the same venue on November 15, 1913, but the Kiwis ran away with the contest 51–3 in front of 10,000 spectators.

Olympic Gold: 1920 and 1924
 Following the end of World War I, the U.S. participated in the Inter-Allied Games where they defeated Romania, before losing to a France XV side, a match in which no caps were awarded. Rugby union had not been played competitively in most of the U.S. for more than a decade before the 1920 Olympics. The U.S. Olympic committee decided that because "California is the only state playing Rugby in the US, the Committee will give sanction but no financial aid". Harry Maloney, coach at Stanford University and then-president of the California rugby union, assembled a mostly California-based team, with seven players from Stanford and six from the University of California, Berkeley. The Olympic Games Committee of the Amateur Athletic Union paid the expenses to transport the team from California to the games in Antwerp. By the time the US Rugby team arrived in Europe, Czechoslovakia and Romania had withdrawn from the competition. France and the U.S. were the only teams left to compete. The U.S. won a shock 8–0 victory over France to earn the gold medal.

The stunned French suggested that the U.S. team tour France, which they did; winning three out of the four matches they played. Between 1920 and 1924, however, rugby union virtually disappeared once again in the U.S., as American football soared in popularity.

The 1924 Paris Olympics caused France to challenge the U.S. to defend its title. Once again, the U.S. Olympic Committee granted permission but no funds. Nonetheless, seven players of the 1920 team dusted off their boots, raised $20,000, found 15 new players including some American football players who had never played in a rugby union match. The assembled U.S. team was again based heavily from Northern California, with 9 Stanford alumni, 5 from Santa Clara, and 3 from Cal. The team headed for England to play some tuneup matches, where they were beaten four times.

The French Olympic Committee (FOC) had scheduled the rugby event to kick off the 1924 Paris Games at Colombes Stadium in Paris.  Romania and the U.S. were expected to provide only token opposition for the European champions. On Sunday, May 11, the U.S. pounded Romania 39 to 0, including nine tries.

The final was played at Colombes Stadium on May 18 before an estimated crowd of 30,000–50,000 that had gathered to watch the rugby final and the awarding of the first medal of the 1924 Olympics. Bookmakers set the odds at five to one with a 20-point spread. However, the Americans were not intimidated, and the American captain Babe Slater wrote in his diary before the match "we are sure going to let them know they have been in a battle." Despite the odds, the U.S. team started well, led by captain Colby "Babe" Slater, and led 3–0 at the half. Heavy tackling by the Americans, derived from American football, intimidated and exhausted the French, as the U.S. scored four tries in the second half to defeat the French 17–3. Rare vintage film footage of the 1924 gold medal match was released in the documentary, "A Giant Awakens: the Rise of American Rugby".

Shortly after the 1924 Olympics, however, the International Olympic Committee (IOC) removed rugby union as an Olympic sport. Without the Olympic incentive, the sport's growth in America collapsed and the game remained dormant.

Modern history

The 1960s and 1970s
The sport then enjoyed a renaissance, beginning in the 1960s and continuing through the 1970s. This created the need for a national governing body to represent the United States in the international rugby community. The United States of America Rugby Football Union (now known as USA Rugby) was formed in 1975 by four territorial organizations (Pacific Coast, West, Midwest, and East). The first Eagles match was played against Australia in 1976, before a crowd of 7,000 at Glover Stadium in Anaheim. The Wallabies won 24–12.

The U.S. also performed well against France in Chicago, losing the game 14–33, in front of 8,000 fans. The next season the Eagles played two internationals, one against England (XV-not capped) at Twickenham on their 1977 United States rugby union tour of England, which they lost 37–11, and the other against Canada, which they also lost, 17–6. The U.S. played the Canadians again in 1978, and defeated them 12–7 in Baltimore. They then travelled to Canada in 1979 and lost 19–12 in Toronto.

The 1980s
The U.S. national team came to further prominence during the 1980s, and from the start of the decade, were playing a notably larger number of games every season. They did however lose all three of their games in 1980, all at home. They could not muster up a win in 1981 either, losing 3–6 to Canada, and 7–38 to South Africa, in what was considered to be the lowest attended international rugby match, with only 30 spectators present at a private polo ground in Glenville, New York. In 1982, the U.S. drew Canada 3–3. They travelled to Australia in 1983 to play the Wallabies, and lost 49–3 in Sydney. The U.S. played its first-ever match against Japan in 1985, winning 16–15 at the Prince Chichibu Memorial Stadium.

The U.S. participated in 1987 in the first ever Rugby World Cup in New Zealand and Australia. The U.S. were in Pool 1, alongside co-hosts Australia, England and Japan. The U.S. won their first ever World Cup game, defeating Japan 21–18 at Ballymore Stadium in Brisbane, with fullback Ray Nelson scoring 13 points. The U.S. lost both subsequent matches; 47–12 against the Wallabies and 34–6 against England. The U.S. finished third in the pool, out of contention for the quarterfinals.

The Eagles first met Wales at Cardiff in November 1987 as the final match of their 1987 tour, where Wales, who had just finished third in the inaugural Rugby World Cup, enjoyed a 46–0 win. In 1988, the Eagles had mixed success in their tour of Europe, defeating Romania but losing to the Soviet Union.

The 1990s
The U.S. notched three consecutive wins from September 1990 to May 1991 — all against Japan — for the first three-match win streak in U.S. team history.

The U.S. made their way through a qualifying tournament to reach the 1991 Rugby World Cup in the United Kingdom, pooled with defending champions New Zealand, hosts England, and Italy in a tough group. In their first match of the tournament, Italy defeated them 30–9. Next, New Zealand defeated them 46–6. Hosts England won 37–9 at Twickenham. The U.S. finished fourth in the pool.

The Eagles came close to beating an Australian XV side, at Riverside in 1993, losing 22–26.

In round one of the Americas qualifying tournament for the 1995 Rugby World Cup the U.S. defeated Bermuda 60–3 to advance to round two. Argentina defeated the Eagles twice in close games in the series to qualify, leaving the U.S. missing out on the 1995 Rugby World Cup in South Africa.

The Eagles had a successful tour of Europe in 1998, beating Spain and Portugal. Also in 1998, the U.S. played Fiji for the first time, losing 9–18 in Suva.

The Eagles set out to qualify for the 1999 Rugby World Cup in Wales. In round four of the Americas qualifying tournament in Buenos Aires, the United States lost 52–24 to Argentina and 31–14 to Canada, but defeated Uruguay 21–16 in their last game to qualify for the 1999 tournament. The U.S. played in the 1999 Pacific Rim Championship, notching its first-ever victories over Fiji (25–14) and Tonga (30–10).

However, the Eagles subsequently suffered their heaviest defeat ever, losing 106–8 to England in a warmup match before the 1999 Rugby World Cup. 

The Eagles entered the 1999 Rugby World Cup in pool E alongside Australia, Ireland and Romania. In their first game, the United States went down 53–8 to Ireland. They then lost to Romania 27–25. Australia defeated the Eagles 55–19 in their final game of the tournament, seeing the Eagles finish fourth in the pool. The Eagles, however, had the honor of being the only side to score a try against the eventual champions, Australia, during the entire tournament.

The 2000s
In qualifying matches for the 2003 Rugby World Cup the U.S. finished third in the Americas. The U.S. won the repechage and qualified for the 2003 tournament by beating Spain 62–13 and 58–13. The Super Powers Cup was first contested in 2003 between Japan, Russia and the United States. The U.S. then followed up with victories over Japan and Canada. This was the first time the Eagles had won four consecutive tests since making their international debut in 1976.

At the 2003 Rugby World Cup the Eagles finished fourth of five in their pool. In the first match against Fiji, the Americans led 13–3 early in the second half, but Fiji regained the lead and secured a 19–18 win, with the Eagles suffering their ninth consecutive World Cup loss. The U.S. then lost to Scotland.  The Americans defeated Japan 39–26, behind 17 points by Mike Hercus, for their first win in a Rugby World Cup since 1987 (also against Japan). The U.S. closed the tournament with a loss to France, concluding the tournament with a 1–3 record.

The 2004 Super Powers Cup saw the addition of Canada. The U.S. beat Russia in the third-place play-off. The U.S. toured Europe in November 2004, losing 55–6 to Ireland and 43–25 to Italy. The 2005 Super Cup took part between the U.S., Canada, Japan and Romania. The U.S. lost 30–26 to Canada but beat a Romanian team stripped of their France-based players 23–16 in the third place play-off.

The U.S. campaign to qualify for the 2007 Rugby World Cup began in 2006. The U.S. lost 56–7 to Canada, resulting in a home/away play-off against Uruguay. The U.S. defeated Uruguay 42–13 in the first match and 26–7 in the second to send them through to the Rugby World Cup.

In the 2007 Rugby World Cup, the U.S. joined England, Samoa, South Africa and Tonga in Pool A. The Eagles, ranked 13th in the world standings, lost all 4 games in Pool A, scoring 1 bonus point in the game against Samoa. Coached by New Zealander Peter Thorburn, the Eagles started off with tough match against the defending world champions England, losing 28–10.  The U.S. was then beaten by Tonga 25–15, lost to Samoa 25–21, and lost their final match to highly favored South Africa 64–15. The Eagles, however, had a major highlight in the South Africa match. After a Todd Clever interception and a pair of passes, Takudzwa Ngwenya sped down the sideline and outran the speedster Bryan Habana to score a try that received Try of the Year honors at the 2007 IRB Awards.

Following the resignation of Scott Johnson, on March 5, 2009 Eddie O'Sullivan was named the new national coach.

The Eagles finished a solid 2009 campaign at a mark of 4–5, with a 4–3 record in full internationals. In the 2009 Churchill Cup, the Eagles lost to Ireland and Wales, but defeated Georgia to take home the Bowl.

The 2011 Rugby World Cup cycle
The Eagles split a World Cup qualifying series with Canada, but lost on aggregate points. The Eagles then faced Uruguay in a two-game playoff. In November 2009, the United States booked their place at the 2011 Rugby World Cup with two wins against Uruguay, winning the home leg 27–6 in Florida.

The Eagles played 7 matches in 2010: 3 home matches in June at the Churchill Cup, finishing with a 1–2 record, and 4 matches in Europe in the Fall, finishing 1–3.
In the June 2010 Churchill Cup, the US beat Russia 39–22, before losing to the England Saxons 32–9 and France A 24–10. 
For the November 2010 tests, the Eagles traveled to Europe. The Eagles defeated Portugal 22–17, but lost to Scotland A 25–0, and lost to Georgia 19–17.  
The Eagles finished 2010 ranked 16th in the world, and with a record in test matches of 2 wins (Russia, Portugal) and 1 loss (Georgia).

The buildup to the 2011 Rugby World Cup started in June with three matches in the Churchill Cup.  The Eagles dropped their first matches to the England Saxons 87–8 and to Tonga 44–13, before defeating Russia 32–25. 2011 was the final Churchill Cup.
The Eagles finalized their 2011 Rugby World Cup preparations with three test matches in August. The Eagles lost to Canada 28–22, lost their second match against Canada 27–7. and lost to Japan 20–14.  The Eagles had a 1–5 record in test matches for the year in their preparations for the 2011 Rugby World Cup.

In their 2011 Rugby World Cup opening match against Ireland the Eagles defense initially held, before conceding their first try at the 39' mark.  The final tally was 22–10.
The Eagles came into the World Cup with their measuring mark for success as being a win over Russia. The Americans took a 10–3 lead into the half, and held on to win 13–6.
For their third match, Australia dominated, leading to the final result of 67–5, the worst defeat a U.S. team has ever suffered to Australia.
The final match saw the Eagles playing Italy for a third-place finish in Pool C.  The Italians finished with a 27–10 victory.  The defeat marked the end of the 2011 Rugby World Cup for the U.S.

The Eagles finished 2011 with a record of 2–7 in full tests. The performances in the Rugby World Cup showed improvement, and the win over Russia left the team with a 1–3 RWC record and feeling as a modest success. The World Cup also saw prop Mike MacDonald become both the most capped Eagle in World Cup play (11 caps) and the most capped Eagle of all time at 65 caps.  Also notable was the performance of lock John van der Giessen, who achieved the most lineout steals of all players in the 2011 Rugby World Cup, despite appearing in only three matches.

The 2015 Rugby World Cup cycle
The Eagles played three matches in North America during the 2012 June international window. This was a regular series of international tests for the United States against Tier 1 (Italy) and Tier 2 (Canada, Georgia) opponents, as the Churchill Cup is no longer held.  The highlights of the June tests were a win over higher-ranked Georgia, and a match against Italy at BBVA Compass Stadium in Houston that drew a record crowd of 17,214.
The Eagles also played three matches in Europe during the November 2012 tests. The Eagles finished their European tour with 2 wins (Romania, Russia) and 1 loss (Tonga) — the first time since 1998 that the Eagles had concluded a European tour with a winning record — and improved in ranking from 17th to 16th.

The U.S. played five matches during the June 2013 international test window, with one test match against Ireland and four matches as part of the 2013 IRB Pacific Nations Cup.  The U.S. started with competitive matches against Canada (9–16), Ireland (12–15), and Tonga (9–18), but finished with double-digit losses against Fiji (10–35) and Japan (20–38), and sliding to #18 in the rankings.
In August 2013, the U.S. played a home-and-away series against Canada as part of qualifying for the 2015 Rugby World Cup. The U.S. lost both matches by an aggregate score of 20–40, meaning the U.S. must play Uruguay in 2014 as part of 2015 RWC qualifying.
In November 2013, the U.S. lost 19–29 to the Māori All Blacks at PPL Park in Philadelphia before a sold-out crowd of 18,500.

Throughout late 2013 and early 2014, a number of U.S. players signed contracts to play professionally overseas. Of the players called into the U.S. national team in March 2014 for two home-and-away 2015 Rugby World Cup qualifying matches against Uruguay, 14 of the 26 were playing professionally overseas, with 10 playing professionally in England.
The Eagles defeated Uruguay 59–40 on aggregate over two tests during 2014 to qualify for the 2015 Rugby World Cup. During the June 2014 test window, the U.S. played competitive matches against higher ranked Scotland and Japan, and the test window culminated with a 38–35 victory over Canada. Subsequently, in November 2014 the Eagles were defeated 74–6 by New Zealand in a match played in front of a crowd of more than 61,000 spectators at Soldier Field, Chicago.

The Eagles began a lengthy assembly in build up to the 2015 Rugby World Cup with the 2015 Pacific Nations Cup. On July 18, the U.S. dropped the opening PNC match 21–16 to Samoa. The team bounced back to upset Japan 23–18. The Eagles, however, fell to Tonga in the final preliminary match for the PNC 33–19. In the resulting fifth-place match, the Eagles edged rival Canada 15–13. The victory was the second consecutive over team Canada. Three weeks later, Canada and the U.S. met again in a World Cup warmup match. For the first time, the U.S. laid claim to a three-match win streak over team Canada after defeating the Canadians 41–23. Continuing on the road to the World Cup, the U.S. faced off against English Premiership side Harlequins, where the Americans fell to the visitors 24–19. The Eagles returned to Soldier Field to compete against the #2 ranked Australia Wallabies. The Americans trailed 14–10 at the half. In the second half, the Wallabies capitalized on American errors and pushed the match out of reach: Australia 47, the U.S. 10.

Professional era (2016–present)

The Professional Rugby Organization (PRO Rugby) began a professional rugby competition in 2016. Five teams played a 10-match schedule from April to July. Each PRO Rugby team had a quota for overseas players and U.S. Eagles internationals. The U.S. national team included 14 professionals in the starting lineup for the June 2015 test against Italy — six U.S.-based professionals and eight overseas professionals. PRO Rugby did not last long, however, with the competition folding after only one season.

Professional rugby returned in 2018 with the advent of Major League Rugby, a seven-team competition that runs from April to early July. U.S. head coach Gary Gold called up an all-professional squad for the June 2018 tests, drawing from a mix of Major League Rugby players and overseas professionals. During the June 2018 tests, the U.S. defeated Scotland 30–29 to give the U.S. its first win over a Tier 1 nation since beating France at the 1924 Olympics. In the November tests, the U.S added wins against Canada (42–17), Samoa (30–29), and Romania (31–5) to ensure their longest full international test win streak in team history with 10. The streak ended with a defeat to Ireland in Dublin. In their first match of the 2019 Rugby World Cup, they were defeated (45–7) against England.

Recent results
The following table shows the results of the U.S. national team during the previous 24 months, as well as upcoming fixtures.

Notes:
 Opponent rank is listed as of the date of the match.
 Green shading indicates a win or tie against a higher ranked opponent. Red shading indicates a loss or tie against a lower ranked opponent.
 Bolded attendance figures indicate the match is one of the top five highest attended home matches in U.S. national team history.

Coaches 
Head Coach:  Gary Gold
 Assistant Coach:  Stephen Brett (Backs and Attack)
 Assistant Coach:  John Plumtree (Defence)
 Assistant Coach:  Mario Ledesma (Set-piece)

Former head coaches
Correct as of 19 November 2022

Players

Current squad
On 28 October, head coach Gary Gold named a 30-man squad for the 2023 RWC Final Qualification Tournament in Dubai.

 Caps Updated: 31 October 2022

Player records

Most caps

All Time

Last updated: November 18, 2022. Statistics include officially capped matches only.

Active Players

Previous record holders: 
 Mike Purcell — 1980–1987, 14 caps (U.S. record co-holder at time of retirement), 14 starts, 4 tries. 2 tries at the 1987 Rugby World Cup.
 Kevin Swords — 1985–1994, 36 caps (U.S. record holder at the time of his retirement), U.S. captain, Barbarians (2).
 Christopher Lippert — 1989–1998, 38 caps (U.S. record holder at the time of his retirement), U.S. captain (3), Barbarians (3).

Most tries

All Time

Last updated: November 18, 2022. Statistics include officially capped matches only.

Active Players

Most points

All Time

Last updated: November 18, 2022. Statistics include officially capped matches only.

Active Players

Stadium and attendance
The Eagles do not have an official home stadium. Boxer Stadium in  San Francisco was the unofficial home of the Eagles from 1996 to 2000, hosting 12 of their 17 test matches. The Eagles also played several of their home games at Infinity Park in Denver, Colorado. The Eagles played a home match against a Tier 1 nation every June between 2012 and 2014, in front of large crowds at BBVA Stadium in Houston, Texas. Since 2012, the Eagles have played at other MLS stadiums, such as Talen Energy Stadium in Philadelphia and the Dignity Health Sports Park in Los Angeles. The Eagles play some of their less high-profile matches at smaller soccer venues.

The highest attended matches in the U.S. involving the U.S. national team are:

Notes

The international rugby match in the U.S. with the largest crowd did not involve the United States national team; 62,000 watched Ireland defeat New Zealand 40–29 at Soldier Field on November 5, 2016.

Rivalry with Canada 

The United States' biggest rival in rugby is Canada.  The US has played more test matches against Canada than any other country.  The two teams first met in 1977, and have played every year since then with the exceptions of 2010 and 2020.  As of the end of 2019, the two sides have met 58 times, with 22 wins for the U.S., 38 wins for Canada, and 2 draws.

The U.S. and Canada routinely play each other in qualifying matches for the Rugby World Cup.  They have met in the qualification stages for every tournament, except for the 1987 tournament, for which teams were invited rather than going through qualification matches, and the 1995 tournament, for which Canada had automatically qualified by finishing as a quarterfinalist in the 1991 Rugby World Cup. Since 2015, the teams play each other annually at the Americas Rugby Championship.

The U.S. has been undefeated in the last 12 matches, with 11 wins and a draw. The first victory of the Eagles' current unbeaten streak ended a seven-match winning streak by Canada that lasted from 2009 through 2013.

Rugby World Cup

The United States has qualified for every Rugby World Cup except the 1995 and 2023 tournament. The best result that the U.S. has managed at a Rugby World Cup is to win one game, which it accomplished in 1987, 2003, and again in 2011.

Other tournaments

Honors
2018 Americas Rugby Championship – Champion
2017 Americas Rugby Championship – Champion
1924 Olympics – Gold Medal
1920 Olympics – Gold Medal

Pacific Nations Cup

The Pacific Nations Cup has been played every year since 2006, and has been played in its current format since 2013, when the United States and Canada joined Japan, Fiji, Samoa and Tonga.

Americas Rugby Championship

The Americas Rugby Championship pits the six highest ranked rugby nations in North and South America (Argentina XV, Brazil, Canada, Chile, United States, and Uruguay). It was first contested in 2016.

Summer Olympics

Rugby was included an Olympic sport four times from 1900 to 1924, with the United States winning the last two of those tournaments — 1920 and 1924. After a lengthy absence, rugby returned to the Summer Olympics in 2016, albeit in the rugby sevens format.

Defunct competitions

Pacific Rim Rugby Championship

Churchill Cup

Super Cup

Overall record and rankings

Below is table of the representative rugby matches played by a United States national XV at test level up until November 19, 2022.

Wins against Tier 1 nations
The following is a list of U.S.'s wins against Tier 1 countries, including XV sides:

Record against Tier 1 teams
The following table shows the top ten best U.S. results in test matches against Tier 1 opponents.

Other U.S. national teams

USA Falcons

The USA Falcons, formerly the USA Selects is the second national rugby team for the United States. The USA Falcons is a developmental team, usually fielding younger players looking to break into the U.S. national team, and sometimes including amateur domestic U.S. national team players who need more high-level matches.

The USA Selects formerly participated in the Americas Rugby Championship, when the tournament only featured "A" sides for Argentina, Canada, the United States, and Uruguay. The USA Selects best results in the ARC were their second-place finishes in 2013 and 2014 Since 2016, the ARC only features an A team from Argentina along with the national sides of Brazil, Canada, Chile, Uruguay, and the United States. The USA Falcons now play in a separate tournament known as the Americas Pacific Challenge.

Women's national team

The U.S. women's national team, officially formed in 1987, has been an international powerhouse since its inception, although more recently have fallen behind other powerhouses such as England and New Zealand on the world rankings. The Eagles won the first official World Cup in 1991, and finished second in the two following World Cups (1994, 1998). The Eagles have set a high standard for international competition, leading an ensuing wave of women's rugby growth and game development worldwide.  The US finished 7th in the 2002 tournament.  The women's national team traveled to the United Kingdom in January 2006 to play Scotland, Ireland and England, winning all three games. The 2006 Women's Rugby World Cup was held in Edmonton, Canada.

See also

 Rugby union in the United States
 USA Rugby
 United States national rugby sevens team
 United States national under-20 rugby union team
 List of United States national rugby union players
 Rugby World Cup
 American Cougars

Notes and references

External links

 
North American national rugby union teams